Anthems for Doomed Youth is the fourth studio album from Canadian indie pop act The High Dials, released on November 2, 2010, on the Rainbow Quartz label. The album's title makes reference to a poem by World War I poet Wilfred Owen.
The album was self-recorded by the band in an abandoned naval building before being mixed by Michael Musmanno (Lilys) in New York City.  The music has been likened to R.E.M., Echo and the Bunnymen and The Smiths. The song "Uruguay" features in the background of an episode of the Netflix series House of Cards (episode 28, season 2)

Track listing

References

2010 albums
The High Dials albums